Mark Whitaker may refer to:

 Mark Whitaker (journalist) (born 1957), American journalist and media executive
 Mark Whitaker (record producer), American music producer
 Mark Whitaker (cricketer) (born 1946), former English cricketer

See also
 Mark Whittaker (born 1965), Australian journalist and non-fiction writer
 Mark Whitacre  (born 1957), American executive and informant